A Few Days in September (Quelques jours en septembre) is the first film directed by Santiago Amigorena. The film premiered out of competition at the 2006 Venice Film Festival and received a special screening at the 2006 Toronto Film Festival.

Plot
A Few Days in September imagines a scenario in which an American C.I.A. agent, Elliot, with advance intelligence about the attacks on New York's World Trade Center towers is being chased by an assassin, William Pound, while he is trying to reunite with his two grown up children with the help of an old colleague, Irène.

Cast
Juliette Binoche as Irène
John Turturro as William Pound
Sara Forestier as Orlando
Tom Riley as David
Nick Nolte as Elliot

Home media
Koch-Lorber Films released the film on DVD in the US in 2007. Fledgling distributor Transmedia Pictures gave the film a limited release in the United Kingdom and Ireland, releasing the film on 14 September 2007. It was released on DVD in the UK by High Fliers Films in September 2009. Aztec International released the film in Australia, licensing the DVD rights to Madman Films.

Alternative versions
In September 2007 French language television station TV5 broadcast a reduced version of the film, running at 90 minutes—22 minutes shorter than the original French theatrical version. This version begins on September 6, 2001, when Irène brings Orlando and David to her apartment, removing the opening scene on Orlando's farm and the aborted hotel meeting with Elliot. As such it removes September 5 from the narrative. The version of the film was released in Portugal in November 2006 had a slightly longer running time; A number of extra scenes were included in this version at producer Paolo Branco's request. This version opens with Irène in her apartment receiving a letter from Elliot. It also includes scenes of Orlando target practicing on her farm and of Irène and William Pound sitting in his truck reminiscing on their shared history.

Reception
Reviews of the film were mixed to negative, with Rotten Tomatoes giving the film a 44% rating.

References

External links
 
 
 BBC David Mattin, 6 September 2007
 The Hollywood Reporter Ray Bennett, September 1, 2006
 Filmcritic.com Christopher Null

2006 films
French multilingual films
Italian multilingual films
2000s French-language films
2006 drama films
Films about terrorism in Europe
Films based on the September 11 attacks
Films produced by Paulo Branco
Films set in Venice
2006 directorial debut films
2000s English-language films